Jacob Lange may refer to:
 Jacob Otto Lange (1833–1902), Norwegian politician
 Jacob Erik Lange (1767–1825), Norwegian military officer and politician